Nihal Seneviratne is a Sri Lankan civil servant. He was the former Secretary General of Parliament (1981–1994) and parliamentary affairs adviser to the Prime Minister

Educated at the Royal College, Colombo and graduated with an LL.B. degree in law from the University of Ceylon, Peradeniya. His brother, Kirthi Nissanka, was a professor of Medicine and founder director of Sri Lanka's Postgraduate Institute of Medicine.

Upon graduation he joined the office of the clerk of House of Representatives, and went on to become the Secretary General of Parliament. He was Secretary General and present at the parliament during the 1987 grenade attack in the Sri Lankan Parliament.

References

Living people
Sinhalese lawyers
Sri Lankan Buddhists
Alumni of Royal College, Colombo
Alumni of the University of Ceylon (Peradeniya)
Sinhalese civil servants
Year of birth missing (living people)